Kosciusko is an unincorporated community in Wilson County, Texas, United States. In 2009 it was inhabited by 390 people.

Name 
The settlement was named after Tadeusz Kościuszko, a military general of Polish origin, that served in the Continental Army during the American Revolutionary War. Kosciusko is the anglicisation of his name.

History 
Kosciusko was established in around 1890, as a rural supply point for Polish and German immigrants, that traveled to tha area by railroad. In 1900, the settlement had 22 inhabitants. In that year there was a store opened in Kosciusko. From 1906 to 1920, in the settlement operated a local post office. In 1930, it had a population of 10, and in 1947, it had a population of 40, and three businesses functioning in the settlement. In 1990, 2000, and 2009, the population had been reported to be 390.

References 

Unincorporated communities in Texas
Polish-American culture in Texas
German-American culture in Texas
Unincorporated communities in Wilson County, Texas
Polish communities in the United States
German communities in the United States
Populated places established in 1890
1890 establishments in Texas